The Labyrinth of Solitude is a 1950 book-length essay by the Mexican poet Octavio Paz. One of his most famous works, it consists of nine parts: "The Pachuco and other extremes", "Mexican Masks", "The Day of the Dead", "The Sons of La Malinche", "The Conquest and Colonialism", "From Independence to the Revolution", "The Mexican Intelligence", "The Present Day" and "The Dialectic of Solitude". After 1975 some editions included the three-part essay "Posdata" (this essay, which translates to "Postscript," was published previously as a standalone book in 1970, and translated for an English edition in 1972 under the title The Other Mexico: Critique of the Pyramid),  which discusses the massacre of hundreds of Mexican students in 1968. (Paz abandoned his position as ambassador in India in reaction to this event.) The essays are predominantly concerned with the theme of Mexican identity and demonstrate how, at the end of the existential labyrinth, there is a profound feeling of solitude. As Paz argues:

Paz observes that solitude is responsible for the Mexican's perspective on death, fiesta, and identity. Death is celebrated but at the same time repelled because of the uncertainty behind it. As for the fiestas, they express a sense of communality, crucially emphasizing the idea of not being alone and in doing so, help to bring out the true Mexican that is usually hidden behind a mask of self-denial. This represents the way in which the Mexicans have inherited two distinct cultures, the Spanish and the Indigenous, but by denying one part of their identity, they become stuck in a world of solitude.

From the chapter "The Conquest and Colonialism" onwards, Paz makes a detailed analysis of Mexican history beginning with a look at the Pre-Columbian culture and in particular reflecting on the 1910 Revolt. In his analysis, he expresses how the humanists take a primary role as the intellectuals of the country. His major criticism is that to be an intellectual it is necessary to distance oneself from the subject that you are studying so that the argument remains critical yet rational and objective. As the intellectual gets more involved with the political environment, his arguments can often become influenced by other factors such as political motivation and pressure to conform.

The critic Harold Bloom listed The Labyrinth of Solitude as one of the artistic works that have been important and influential in Western culture in The Western Canon (1994).

See also

References

1950 non-fiction books
Essay collections
Mexican literature
Octavio Paz